Libuše Domanínská (née Klobásková, married Vyčichlová; 4 July 1924 – 2 February 2021) was a Czech classical soprano who had a career in concert and opera from the 1940s through the 1970s. She was a leading member of the Brno National Theatre and later the Prague National Theatre where she sang a repertoire of 50 roles, especially as Janáček's Jenůfa, Káťa Kabanová and The Cunning Little Vixen. She was instrumental in making the composer's operas known internationally, both in recordings and guest appearances.

Life and career 
Libuše Klobásková was born in Brno, Czechoslovakia, on 4 July 1924. Her father was a wine expert, and her family moved from Moravia to Košice in the Slovakian part, where she  first performed on a stage in an amateur theatre show at age five. At age eight, she was nicknamed "the lark of Košice" when she sang for a local radio. When an independent Slovakia was proclaimed in 1939 under the Nazis, Czechs were expelled from Slovakia, and her family moved to Brno. At age 15, she applied for studies at the conservatory, but was regarded as not strong enough for singing. In 1940, she was accepted, and studied  with Hana Pírková and Bohuslaw Sobeský. The conductor Bretislav Bakala let her perform with his orchestra for the Brno radio in her third year of studies. He would study the role of Káťa Kabanová with her. She appeared more often on radio which in the 1940s meant live performances.

After World War II, she continued her singing studies, also with Marie Řezníčková, and at the same time appeared at the Brno National Theatre. She made her stage debut as Blaženka in Smetana's The Secret in August 1945 and became a leading member at the house, where she remained for ten seasons. Her soprano voice, described as a warm spinto "gifted in cantilena and capable of delicate expressive nuances", was suitable to roles by Smetana and Janáček's Jenůfa, Káťa Kabanová and The Cunning Little Vixen. She became a member of the Prague National Theatre in 1955, performing 50 roles, including besides the Czech repertoire also Mozart operas, Italian repertoire such as Verdi's Aida and Elisabetta in Don Carlos, and Russian operas. She performed in all of Janáček's operas.

With the Prague company, she toured to Moscow in 1955, to the Holland Festival in 1959, and to the Edinburgh Festival, where she appeared in 1964 in roles from Czech operas: Jitka in Smetana's Dalibor in the English premiere of the opera, and the title roles in Dvořák's Rusalka and Káťa Kabanová. The company also performed at the Sibelius Festival in Helsinki. She sang as a guest at the Komische Oper Berlin in 1956, at both the Teatro Colón in Buenos Aires and the Teatro di San Carlo in Naples in 1968, and regularly at the Wiener Volksoper from 1958 to 1965.

Domanínská recorded the title role of Jenůfa in 1970. It was the first stereo recording of the opera, paving the way for more recordings of Janáček's operas and for greater recognition of his work around the world. A reviewer of Gramophone wrote when it was reissued in 1995: "Libuse Domaninska is a tender Jenufa, vulnerable near the start but also in her own way deepening in human understanding as the drama develops; and her response to the music at the end, as she forgives the Kostelnicka and takes Laca, is true to Janacek's soaring melodic phrases." She performed alongside Naděžda Kniplová as the Kostelnicka, Ivo Žídek as Steva, and Vilém Přibyl as Laca, conducted by Bohumil Gregor.

In concert, she performed oratorios and masses by Bach, Handel, Haydn, Mozart, Beethoven and Dvořák, and Lieder. She sang the soprano solo of Janáček's Glagolitic Mass at La Scala in Milan.

Domanínská died in Hodonín on 2 February 2021, at the age of 96.

Roles in Prague 
The roles that Domanínská performed in Prague include:

References

External links 
 
 
 Martina Klausová: Pěvkyně Libuše Domanínská (in Czech, pictured) classicpraha.cz 12 September 2019
 Libuše Domanínská goout.net
 Libuše Domanínská (recordings) supraphonline.cz
 

1924 births
2021 deaths
Czechoslovak women opera singers
Czech operatic sopranos
Musicians from Brno
Brno Conservatory alumni
Recipients of the Thalia Award